Ángel Federico Robledo (18 July 1917 – 14 November 2014) was an Argentinian politician, who occupied several posts during the presidencies of Juan Perón, Héctor José Cámpora, and Isabel Perón, such as Minister of Defense, Minister of Foreign Relationships, and Minister of Interior. Also he served as Argentinian Ambassador to Ecuador, Mexico and Brazil in different periods.

He was born Bustinza, Santa Fe province and studied law at National University of the Littoral.

References
 

Foreign ministers of Argentina
1917 births
2014 deaths
20th-century Argentine lawyers
People from Santa Fe, Argentina
National University of the Littoral alumni